Alexis Vélez Alberio, also known as Alex Zurdo, is a Puerto Rican Christian music rapper and songwriter.

He has almost a dozen musical productions, and has been awarded the GMA Dove Award and Arpa Awards, having also been nominated for a Latin Grammy, and a Premio Tu Música Urbano.

He has been the main artist in various concerts and events around Latin America, sharing stages with Funky, Vico C, Marcos Witt, Christine D'Clario, Tercer Cielo, Danilo Montero, Marcos Vidal, and collaborated with artists such as Olga Tañón, Gabriel Rodríguez EMC, among others.

Musical career 
Alex Zurdo, was born on June 10, 1983, in Trujillo Alto, Puerto Rico. At the age of 11 he wrote his first rap songs. At 13, he had his first piano and learned to play it himself. In the following years he participated in several non-Christian rap and reggaeton productions as "Zurdo", in duet with Rey Blasto, Alex did also a duet with Blasto in 2003 in the album Rolexx: La Hora De La Venganza. In the next year at the age of 21, he began his musical ministry, including ministrations, conferences and seminars and launched his first production of Christian music, entitled "Nada es mío", distributed by Universal Music Latino.

After his first album, Alex released from 2005 to 2009, one album per year. Albums such as Con propósito, Se trata de ti (with Jonny L), De Gloria en Gloria - La Trayectoria, Una y mil razones and Así son las cosas.

His seventh production titled "Mañana Es Hoy" ("Tomorrow is today") took three years. The musical production was in charge of the producer duo Marcos Ramírez and Víctor Torres (Los Tranz4Merz), Effect-O, DJ Cróniko and Alex himself. It was promoted with the single «¿Dónde estás?» ("Where are you?") that talks about the importance of fatherhood. Since 2012, their productions have been released every two years, and nominations and recognitions for various ceremonies such as the Arpa Awards and AMCL began. This album is Alex Zurdo's first to make it onto the Billboard charts, debuting at number 9 on Latin Rhythm Albums, remaining in the top 15 for over 20 weeks. For this record production, Alex won three AMCL Awards in 2012, in the categories Urban album of the year, Urban song of the year for «Mañana es hoy»  and Musical intervention of the year for «Si no hay amor» ("If there is no love") with Vanessa Vissepó.

De la A a la Z ("From A to Z") was launched in 2014 and featured the participation of Redimi2, Christine D'Clario, Nancy Amancio and Samuel Hernández. The album debuted at number 4 on Billboard's Latin Rhythm Albums chart. This album won an AMCL Award in 2014 in the category Urban Album of the Year and Urban Song of the Year for "No soy yo" with Redimi2, and was also nominated at the 2015 Arpa Awards for "Best Urban Album".

On the "From A to Z" tour, Alex Zurdo's first live album was recorded, which was titled AZ Live and was released in 2016. The concert that was used for the recording of the album was that of its presentation in his native country, specifically at the Coliseo de Puerto Rico José Miguel Agrelot. The album was nominated at the 2017 Arpa Awards in the categories "Best Live Album" and "Best Urban Album".

In 2018, he released his album ¿Quién contra nosotros? (Who Against Us? in English), also, it obtained at the Dove Awards the recognition of "Song of the Year in Spanish" for the single «Sin ti», while in 2019, being nominated as Best Christian Album in Spanish at the Latin Grammy Awards, Dove Awards and Arpa Awards, being the winner in these last two ceremonies as "Best Christian Album in Spanish", and "Best Urban Album", respectively. Then, he launched M.E.M.E. in 2020, (acronym for "Menos Ego, Más Enfoque", "Less Ego, More Focus" in English), where the single "Toca la guitarra, Viejo" ("Play the guitar, dad") dedicated to his father, was approached by various media due to the theme touched, Alzheimer's.

In February 2021, he released UNO, an album collaborating with Funky and Redimi2. In March 2021, he participated in "Al Taller del Maestro", a benefit streaming concert performed by Alex Campos, where Evan Craft was also present.

Personal life 
On April 8, 2008, he married Denisse Contreras, sister of singer Daliza Contreras, wife of Dominican rapper Willy González, known as Redimi2.

In 2011, his first child was born. In 2014, Alex Zurdo became a father for the second time.

Discography 

 2004: Nada es mío
 2005: Con propósito
 2006: Se trata de ti (with Jonny L)
 2007: De Gloria en Gloria - La Trayectoria
 2008: Una y mil razones
 2009: Así son las cosas
 2012: Mañana es hoy
 2014: De la A a la Z
 2016: AZ Live
 2018: ¿Quién contra nosotros?
 2020: M.E.M.E.
 2021: UNO (with Funky and Redimi2)
 2022: DTOX

Awards and nominations

Latin Grammy Awards 

|-
| 2019 || ¿Quién contra nosotros? || Best Christian Album ||

Dove Awards 

|-
| 2018 || Sin Ti || Spanish Language Recorded Song of the Year || 
|-
| rowspan="2" | 2019 || ¿Quién contra nosotros? || Spanish Language Album of the Year || 
|-
| Mi GPS || Spanish Language Recorded Song of the Year ||

Arpa Awards 

|-
| 2015 || De la A a la Z || Best Urban Album || 
|-
| rowspan="2" | 2017 || rowspan="2" | AZ Live || Best Urban Album || 
|-
| Best Live Album || 
|-
| 2019 || ¿Quién contra nosotros? || Best Urban Album ||

Unción Awards 

|-
| 2012 || Himself || Best Male Psalmist ||

References 

1983 births
Living people
Converts to Christianity
People from Trujillo Alto, Puerto Rico
Puerto Rican rappers
21st-century American rappers